SC-5, SC5, SC 5 or variants, may refer to:

 SC05, an FIPS 10-4 region code
 SC-05, a subdivision code for Anse Royale, Seychelles, see ISO 3166-2:SC
 South Carolina's 5th congressional district
 South Carolina Highway 5
 USS Cuttlefish (SC-5)
 SpaceX Crew-5

Video games
 Soulcalibur V
 Space Channel 5

See also
 Strathcarron SC-5A